Chen Ting-fei (born 19 July 1974) is a Taiwanese politician. A member of the Democratic Progressive Party, she has been Member of the Legislative Yuan since 2008.

Early life
Chen obtained her bachelor's degree from Chinese Culture University and master's degree in business administration from Chang Jung Christian University.

References

Living people
Democratic Progressive Party Members of the Legislative Yuan
1974 births
Members of the 8th Legislative Yuan
Members of the 9th Legislative Yuan
Tainan Members of the Legislative Yuan
Members of the 10th Legislative Yuan